Ilija Brozović (born 26 May 1991) is a Croatian handball player for TSV Hannover-Burgdorf and the Croatian national team.

Honours
RK Zagreb
Dukat Premier League: 2011–12, 2012–13, 2013–14. 2014–15
Croatian Cup: 2012, 2013, 2014, 2015
SEHA League: 2012–13

THW Kiel
DHB-Pokal: 2017

References

External links

1991 births
Living people
Croatian male handball players
Sportspeople from Split, Croatia
Handball-Bundesliga players
THW Kiel players
RK Zagreb players
Expatriate handball players
Croatian expatriate sportspeople in Germany
Olympic handball players of Croatia
Handball players at the 2016 Summer Olympics